Nachtfalter  (Moths) op. 157 is a waltz by Johann Strauss II written in 1854. The waltz was first performed at a parish festival ball at Unger's Casino in the suburb of Hernals, Vienna on 28 August of the same year.

The work, which first suggests the whirring of the wings of a moth in the Introduction and then its circling flight, failed to gain the recognition many now feel it deserves when first performed in 1854. The Habsburg monarchy has formed an alliance with France and Great Britain during the Crimean War and the action has incurred the wrath of the Russian Tsar. Vienna at that time was also recovering from a devastating cholera outbreak that autumn and many entertainment establishments were finding it difficult to attract patronage to their dance halls and Strauss' works during that time do not reach a wider public attention.

Strauss' work eventually enticed Liszt, who was made aware of the work's charms. The latter was observed at a festive occasion to earnestly entreating his daughter Cosima Wagner to play 'Nachtfalter' with his as a piano duet. Further, performances abroad such as in Pavlovsk and the later in Paris, confirmed the work as one of Strauss' earlier inspired creations.

References

Waltzes by Johann Strauss II
1854 compositions